Airport is a British documentary television series based at London Heathrow Airport, broadcast by the BBC and syndicated to Dave, part of the UKTV network.

The show is a fly-on-the-wall series following passengers and staff who work for the airlines, the airport operator BAA, the animal reception centre, emergency services, customs and immigration, and others. The airlines and staff featured change from series to series, although certain staff feature in multiple series.

History
The first series of Airport aired on BBC One, beginning on 2 May 1996. It was then repeated on BBC Two in April 1997. Originally intended to be a low-key behind-the-scenes documentary, the emergence of several memorable recurring characters gave the show a docusoap feel. Special fame was gained by Jeremy Spake, an Aeroflot employee, whose flamboyance earned him a series of short 'bumpers' on UKTV People explaining how to best use airports. Other airlines featured throughout the series are Aer Lingus, Air Jamaica, Avianca, BMI, Canadian Airlines, Cyprus Airways (1947–2015), Czech Airlines, El Al, Emirates, Gulf Air, Icelandair, Iran Air, Jat Airways, Kuwait Airways, Pakistan International Airlines, Qantas, Qatar Airways and Virgin Atlantic.

There have also been several special Airport programmes over the years featuring airports other than Heathrow, such as Frankfurt and Edinburgh.

The opening titles and music were given a make over for the start of the 7th series in 2002. From the 7th series onwards, incidental music (composed by Cherry Lodge) was added over the scenes shown on screen. The title music was once again revamped for the 10th series in 2005. In addition, Liza Tarbuck replaced John Nettles as the show's narrator for series 10.

Celebrities who have been seen on the show include Stephen Fry, Hugh Hefner, Britney Spears, Kylie Minogue, Joan Collins, Michael Jackson, Pamela Anderson, Blue, Brian May, Tom Jones, Mohammed Burhanuddin, Yusuf Islam, Colin Powell, Kate Winslet, David Beckham, Kriss Akabusi, Al Pacino, Engelbert Humperdinck, Lennox Lewis, Bob Geldof and several government or state officials including Queen Elizabeth II, Princess Diana, the Japanese Emperor and Bill Clinton.

In one episode, a BA staff member gets arrested by the airport police for impersonating someone else. He is arrested on board an incoming flight and is led away by un-uniformed officers.

Regular contributors
John Cull, Qantas Airport Manager, appears in 17 episodes of the series. Jeremy Spake, Aeroflot Airlines Manager makes frequent appearances in the series. Maria Demetriou of Cyprus Airways (1947–2015) appears in many shows. Animal Health Officer Stuart King, Royal Suite manager Anita Newcourt and journalists Russell Clisby and Steve Meller all contribute in many of the series.

Other contributors
These include:-

Production status
Repeats of Airport have been shown on Dave and UKTV People, and they often ran an Airport day or weekend, showing back-to-back episodes for the duration of the day or weekend. Repeats have also be seen on BBC One, although less frequently. There was a new series broadcast in the first half of 2005, which finished in July 2005. Several episodes were broadcast, before a gap of about a month, then the rest of the series was shown.

Airport is also shown once a week on the Australian Lifestyle channel, a feature channel on Australia's Foxtel Digital network and also screens on the AUSTAR network. It is also aired on the free-to-air Nine Network.

Transmissions

Series

Specials

Return to... Airport
On 14 July 2008, the BBC broadcast a new 5-part series titled Return to... Airport. The show featured interviews with stars of the original series and behind the scenes recollections from cast members, as well as original series highlights.

See also
 Airline, a similar television programme
 Come Fly With Me, a comedic mockumentary-style spoof of the Airport format created by Matt Lucas and David Walliams 
 Nothing to Declare UK

References

External links
 

BBC television documentaries
Documentary television series about aviation
1990s British reality television series
1996 British television series debuts
2000s British reality television series
2008 British television series endings
English-language television shows